Ilya Grigorievich Borok (born 10 August 1993) is a Russian jiujitsu fighter. Borok has won many major tournaments in jiujitsu, including the World Championships, the World Games, the World Combat Games and the European Championships.

References

External links
  Ilya Borok on Ju-Sports
  Results of past tournaments

1993 births
Living people
Russian martial artists
Sportspeople from Saint Petersburg
World Games gold medalists
World Games silver medalists
Competitors at the 2013 World Games
Competitors at the 2017 World Games
20th-century Russian people
21st-century Russian people